Mercedes Dorame (born 1980) is a Tongva artist in Los Angeles whose work is in the permanent collections of Hammer Museum and San Francisco Museum of Modern Art, and has been shown at the Catalina Museum for Art and History. She was a Creative Capital Grant recipient for 2020. Her work was covered in the Los Angeles Times, and has been referred to as important for reviving public memory of the Tongva in southern California and paving a way for future Native American artists.

Works 
She works in structural installation, with her works Orion’s Belt—Paahe’ Sheshiiyot—a map for moving between worlds (2018) and Our Land and Sky Waking Up - ‘Eyoo’ooxon koy Tokuupar Chorii’aa (2021) incorporating cog stones found on a site being commercially developed in the north Orange County, California area that are approximately 75,000 years old. Her piece "Portal for Tovaangar" was virtually installed on the LACMA campus.

References 

1980 births
Native American artists
Artists from Los Angeles
Living people